Ageyenko is a Russian last name, a variant of Ageyev.

People with the last name
Egor Ageenko (Yegor Ageyenko), Belarusian ice hockey player for HC Shakhtyor Soligorsk
Mikhail Ageenko (Mikhail Ageyenko), Russian canoeist participating in the 2004 Canoe Slalom World Cup Race 1 – Men's K-1

References

Notes

Sources
И. М. Ганжина (I. M. Ganzhina). "Словарь современных русских фамилий" (Dictionary of Modern Russian Last Names). Москва, 2001. 



Russian-language surnames